The Battle of Badgam was a defensive encounter that took place at Badgam in the Kashmir Valley close to the Srinagar Airport during the initial stages of the First Kashmir War. The skirmishes took place on 3 November 1947 between a company of the Indian Army, aided by Indian Air Force, and a tribal lashkar of Pakistani raiders numbering around 1000, who had apparently occupied Badgam. The battle drew its significance from the success of the solitary company of 4th Battalion, Kumaon Regiment, led by Major Somnath Sharma, in halting the momentum of advancing tribal "Lashkars", though being heavily outnumbered. Sharma was awarded the Param Vir Chakra posthumously for his actions. The Indian Air Force served as an accompaniment to the army's efforts in the battle, contributing to the majority of the casualties inflicted on the Pakistani lashkars.

Backdrop
The battle took place at a point when Indian troops had just begun their fly-in into Srinagar airfield during the opening stages of the war.  The Lashkar were advancing along three axes - North of Wular lake, along the main Muzzafarabad-Baramula-Patan-Srinagar axis, and from Gulmarg. Along the Gulmarg route, a Lashkar of 700 raiders was known to be approaching Badgam but no contact had been made with it. The Lashkar would soon be in a position to seize the airfield and block the induction of Indian troops by air. Alternatively, they could bypass the Patan defenses from the south and reach Srinagar unhindered.

At that moment, only a weak brigade of Indian troops, withdrawn from refugee protection duties in Punjab and hastily airlifted, stood between groups of tribal Lashkars advancing towards Srinagar. Indian troops were deployed only at Srinagar airfield, Magam and Pattan. A detachment of Mahrajah's Bodyguard (State Forces cavalry) reconnoitered North of Wular Lake.

Patrol plan
Brigadier L.P. Sen, newly arrived commander of 161 Infantry Brigade decided to send a strong fighting patrol to the hills overseeing Badgam village 5 km west of it. The task of the patrol was to search the area in the vicinity of Badgam and the area between Badgam and Magam for signs of the infiltrating Pakistanis. The patrol was to comprise two companies of 4th Battalion, Kumaon Regiment (4 KUMAON) reinforced with a company of 1st Battalion, Kumaon Regiment (1 KUMAON). The 1 KUMAON company was tasked to patrol ahead of Badgam by bounds, and link up with 1st Battalion, Punjab Regiment (1 PUNJAB) at Magam after which it would return by road. If no contact was made, the 4 KUMAON companies would fall back one by one, vacating Badgam at 1400 hrs.

Battle of Badgam

On 3 November 1947, Major Somnath Sharma, commanding D Company of 4 KUMAON, led the patrol. The patrol proceeded as planned without incident till the time came for withdrawing from Badgam. Sharma was ordered to fall back one company at a time, one company at 1400 hrs and he along with his company at 1500 hrs. At 1430 hrs, the movement of tribals was seen to the West and near Badgam village. Sharma correctly surmised the movement in Badgam village was meant to divert attention while the attack would come in from the west. The Lashkar attacked from the West. Sharma's company was soon surrounded by the enemy from three sides and sustained heavy casualties from the ensuing mortar bombardment. Sharma realized the importance of holding onto his position as both the city of Srinagar and the airport would be vulnerable if it were lost.

The Indian air forced played a major role in the battle, and caused the majority of Pakistani casualties.

Under heavy fire and outnumbered seven to one, he urged his company to fight bravely, often exposing himself to danger as he ran from post to post. Despite the forward two platoons falling, Sharma desperately clung to his position with the depth platoon.

While he was busy fighting the enemy, a mortar shell exploded on the ammunition near him. His last message to Brigade HQ received a few moments before he was killed was:
"The enemies are only 50 yards from us. We are hopelessly outnumbered. I will not withdraw one inch but fight to the last man last round."

Spurred by his gallantry, Sepoy Dewan Singh Danu attacked the enemy fearlessly before losing his life. Dewan Singh was awarded the Maha Vir Chakra posthumously for inflicting at least 15 casualties.

Brigadier Sen ordered a reorganization of the defenses. 1 PUNJAB was ordered to vacate Magam immediately and fall back to Srinagar. By nightfall troops of 1 PUNJAB were in Srinagar and a detachment was sent to approach the Badgam feature. By then the KUMAON position had been long overrun.

Aftermath of battle
The company of 4 KUMAON under Maj Som Nath Sharma was decimated. For his courageous "last man, last round" stand, Maj Sharma was posthumously awarded the Param Vir Chakra, Independent India's newly instituted highest award for gallantry.

The fierce resistance of Sharma's company had caused 200 casualties to the raiders. Also, the tribal leader of the Lashkar had a bullet through his leg. The Pakistani raiders made no attempt to exploit the vulnerabilities that night and move to the airfield or to Srinagar city. It is surmised that the incapacitation of the leader, the heavy losses, and reports of movement of 1 PUNJAB into the area had caused the raiders to misjudge the tactical situation. This bought time for additional Indian troops to fly into the Srinagar airport the next day, reorganize and block all routes of ingress to Srinagar.

References

 History of the Indian Army
Indo-Pakistani War of 1947–1948
1947 in India